The Mary Pappert School of Music is one of the ten degree-granting divisions that comprise Duquesne University in Pittsburgh, Pennsylvania.

History
The Pappert School of Music was founded in 1926, offering a Bachelor of Music degree. The Bachelor in Music Education program was added in 1930. The building which houses the school was dedicated on 29 April 1967. To commemorate the event, eminent pianist Van Cliburn was awarded an honorary degree. The school has been NASM-accredited  since 1966. The School of Music became an all-Steinway institution in 2001 and is also an "all-Fender" school.

The current collegiate enrollment is approximately 350, and there are about 500 non-credit music students studying in the City Music Center, an elementary through high school program hosted by the school which was founded in 1989.

Programs offered
The School of Music confers four different bachelor degrees, in Performance, Music Technology, Music Education, and Music Therapy.  Graduate programs include master degrees in Performance, Theory/Composition, Sacred Music, Music Technology, and Music Education, as well as an Artist Diploma.  In addition to undergraduate and graduate programs, post-baccalaureate certification is offered in Music Education and Music Therapy.

Ensembles

The Mary Pappert School of Music offers the following large ensembles:
Symphony Orchestra
Wind Symphony
Symphony Band
The Voices of Spirit
Pappert Chorale
Jazz Ensemble

Additionally, all university students interested in music are invited to perform with the Dukes Pep Band at football and basketball games.

Notable faculty 
Claudia Pinza Bozzolla, Voice
George Vosburgh, Trumpet
David Stock, Composer-in-Residence
Joseph Willcox Jenkins †, Composition
Sean Jones, Jazz Trumpet
Joe Negri, Jazz Guitar
Thomas Kikta, Classical Guitar 
Bill Purse, Jazz Guitar 
Multiple Grammy winning Engineer Jay Dudt
Ann Labounsky, Pipe Organ

Notable alumni

Van Cliburn - (honorary)
Joseph Carl Breil – The first person to compose a score specifically for a motion picture
Gene Forrell – Composer and conductor
Sammy Nestico – composer and arranger of big band music
William Schultz (1950) – President and CEO of Fender Musical Instruments Corporation
Bobby Vinton (graduated 1956; honorary Doctorate in Music in 1978)
H. Robert Reynolds, conductor (honorary)

Administration
The dean of the school is David Allen Wehr.

References

External links
 
 City Music Center of Duquesne University website

Music schools in Pennsylvania
School Mary Pappert
Educational institutions established in 1926
1926 establishments in Pennsylvania